Besishahar is a municipality and the district headquarters of Lamjung District in Gandaki Province, Nepal. The Besishahar Municipality was formed by merging the existing Village Development Committees i.e. Besishahar, Gaunshahar, Udipur, Chandisthan, Baglungpani (wards no. 3,4,7,8 & 9), Bajhakhet, Hiletaksar (wards no. 9) and Chiti and have 11 wards. This municipality has a sub-tropical climate with deciduous forests. Annapurna II, Machhapuchhre, Lamjung Himal can be viewed from north of Besishahar Municipality.

Population
At the time of the 2011 Nepal census it had a population of 39,356 including Besishahar, Gaunshahar, Udipur, Chiti, Baglungpani, Bajhakhet and Chandisthan.

Transportation and communications 
Dumre–Besishahar–Chame Highway connects the city to various parts of Nepal. The proximity of this city from Kathmandu (178.8 km), Pokhara (108.9 km), Bharatpur (104 km), Birganj (234 km), Damauli (59 km) and Prithbinarayan(Gorkha) (76 km). Bus, Micro Bus, Taxi and other land transportation are available to go out of the city, for internal transportation Bus, Minibus and Car/Jeep hiring is available.

 Communication – One Television Channel "Lamjung Television" Conducted By Lamjung Media Network Pvt Ltd and three major local FM radio stations broadcast from Besishahar Municipality. They are "Radio Marsyangdi" – 95.0 MHz, "Radio Lamjung" – 88.4 MHz and "Radio Chautari" – 91.4 MHz. Which are Community Radio stations. Land line telephone services and mobile telephone services are available to the majority of areas. There are multiple private Internet service providers available within the Municipality. Besishahar Municipality has print medias Lamjung Highlights, Antarang, Lamjung Aawaz etc.
 Banks – There are more than 25 banks (Pacific Development Bank Ltd, Rastriya Banijya Bank, Nepal Bank Limited, Agricultural Development Bank Limited, Sunrise Bank Limited, Everest Bank, Nabil Bank Limited, Nepal SBI Bank Limited, Triveni Bikas Bank Limited, Grameen Bikas Bank Ltd, Reliable Microfinance Bittiya Sanstha Limited, Chhimek Bikash Bank, Reliable Development Bank, Gandaki Bikas Bank Ltd Etc.) and financial institution in Besishahar Municipality.

Attractions 
 Annapurna Circuit – It is the starting point of the Annapurna Circuit tourist route.
 Marshyandi River – The Marshyandi River flows north to south in the east of Besishahar Municipality. It is the one of the branch of Gandaki River. The Marshyandi Bridge over the river connects eastern Lamjung. It is located in Besishahar Municipality - 2 - Udipur, Lamjung.

 The First Royal Palace Of Lamjung – It is also called Lamjung Durbar. It is the birthplace of the Royal family of Lamjung in 1663 AD. Kalu Shah was the first king. It is also the place where King Yesho Bramha Shah, the founder of Shah Dynasty in Nepal ruled the small principality of Lamjung. This palace was the capital of Lamjung. This palace stands in Gaunshahar.

 Gaikhure Jharana – It is located in Besishahar Municipality - 2 - Udipur.

 Purankot Fort – Used to protect the kingdom of Lamjung. Located near the ruins of Third Royal Palace of Lamjung (the summer home for the royalty).
 Royal Bath – "Tindhara" meaning three taps, is the mineral spring where the royalty bathed.
 Hadkhode Dada – The "Bone Hill", was considered a very dangerous place many cattle have died there. Still a place frequented by many eagles.
 Sutkeri Dunga – The strongest woman in Gaunshahar was said to have placed this very large stone here while pregnant.
 Dare Gauda – A cliff that the Gorkha's army scaled, using long ladders to attack Gaunshahar, burning many houses in the village.
 Middle Marshyandi Hydro Electricity – 70-Megawatt Mid-Marshyangdi Hydroelectricity Project (MMHEP), the second largest hydropower project in the country has started operation from 14 December 2008. PM Pushpa Kamal Dahal (Prachanda) had inaugurated the project. The project was started in June 2001 with joint investments of the Government of Nepal, Germany and Nepal Electricity Authority. It is located in Besishahar Municipality - 2 - Phaliyasanghu, Udipur.
 Karpureshwar Mandir- A religious place for the Hindus. It is the place where people go to worship lord Mahadeva.

Religious and cultural landmarks 
 Lamjung Kalika Temple – It is a historical Hindu goddess temple of Lamjung District located in Gaunshahar. The big sister of the Gorkha Kalika. Open four times a year during festivals(Badha Dashain, Chaitre Dashin, Shree Panchami, and Nuwai).

 Udipur Kalika Temple – It is a Hindu goddess temple of Lamjung District located in Besishahar Municipality - 1 - Udipur, Lamjung. Udipur Kalika is a picnic spot in Lamjung.

 Chandimai Temple – On the seventh day of Bada Dashain, two priest from Gaunshahar travel to Besisahar to steal fruits and flowers and carry back up to this temple. While a parade of villagers and priests carrying a statue of Phulpati go down from the Royal Palace to meet the "thief priests".
 Bhimsen Temple – It is located in Besishahar Municipality -10- Besishahar Lamjung

Educational and institutions 
 Marsyangdi Multiple Campus - Marshyangdi Multiple Campus (MMC), established in 1990 (2047 B.S.), is the first and a leading community campus affiliated with Tribhuvan University. It is situated in the heart of Besishahar city, the headquarter of Lamjung District. MMC came into existence through the collective endeavor of distinguished academicians, social workers, political figures and general public from the community. Founded with the motto of providing quality education basically to the students coming from the rural area of Lamjung District, Tanahun District, Gorkha District and Manang districts and the students who are from underprivileged and marginalized groups as well as middle-class backgrounds at affordable cost. MMC has grown, both in size and in reputation into one of the leading higher educational institutions of the district within short period of its establishment. Nurtured by dedicated and experienced lecturers and efficient working staff, the campus instills the values like compassion, selflessness, dedication, love for fellowmen and above all the thirst for wisdom and knowledge into students and prepares them for the challenges of the modern competitive world. At the end, MMC feels proud to share the fact that it has been selected as a deserving community campus for the Second Higher Education Project of University Grant Commission on national level assessment with the support of World Bank.
 Lamjung Skill Development Foundation (LSDF) Campus – A vast number of adolescents and youth of Nepal are out of the school system as they have been left-out or pushed-out of the school for various reasons and often found to be at the center of the vicious cycle as being either the cause or effect of the decade long armed-conflict. As a strategy to work in economic peace building a group of committed professionals with the support from Swiss-Nepal Society (SNS) and DIGA foundation of Switzerland, has established the Lamjung Skill Development Foundation (LSDF) Campus at Besishahar Municipality-4 Gairi, Lamjung. LSDF in its effort to provide a new life to marginalized youth is committed to provide market based practical oriented high-quality vocational/technical skills to the out-of-school youth so that they can be employed or self-employed after completion of their training. The Campus also aims at being a vehicle for rural reconstruction in the region. The campus opened its doors in summer 2008 with the two first long-term courses in civil construction and carpentry. Additional trades (electronic and mechanical) will be implemented step by step. Additional to the regular long-term courses, the campus regularly hosts short-term trainings according to the local needs. Among others, SNS-supported trainings for goat rearing, off-season vegetable and citrus fruits were carried out in close co-operation with local partners.
 Lamjung Higher Secondary School
 Marsyangdi Higher Secondary School
 Jana Vikas Higher Secondary School
 Ex-Army Boarding Higher Secondary School
 Vidhya Bikas Higher Secondary School
 Earthly Paradise Higher Secondary School
 Shree Jana Kalyan Secondary School
 Land Star English School
 New Vision Montessori School

Hospitals 
 Lamjung District Community Hospital (LDCH) – Since 2001 LDCH has been running under the management of Human Development Community Services (HDCS) with the support of the Government of Nepal. From a 15-bed hospital, LDCH now has 60 beds as well as a range of services, a study from the World Bank quoted Lamjung Hospital as being a "model hospital in Nepal."
 Besishahar Hospital & Research Center – It is located in Besishahar Bazar.
 Besishahar Dental hospital – It is located in Besishahar Bazar.
 Lamjung Polyclinic – It is located in Besishahar Bazar.
 Lamjung Eye Clinic – It is located in Besishahar Bazar.
 Lamjung Model Hospital – It is located in Besishahar Bazar.

2015 earthquake 
The town shook during earthquake on 25 April 2015. Houses made of mud collapsed, while those made of concrete survived. There were no visible cracks on buildings. There was little damage. The town largely escaped the devastation suffered in other places in Nepal.

Photos of Besishahar Municipality

See also
 Gaunshahar
 Udipur
 Chandisthan
 Lamjung District
 Ghalegaun

References

External links
http://www.radiomarsyangdi.org
http://www.radiolamjung.org
http://www.radiochautari.org
http://www.lamjungnews.com
https://web.archive.org/web/20180906224422/http://marshyangdimultiplecampus.edu.np/

Lamjung District
Municipalities in Gandaki Province
Populated places in Lamjung District
Nepal municipalities established in 2014